The blue-cheeked butterflyfish (Chaetodon semilarvatus) is a species of marine ray-finned fish, a butterflyfish belonging to the family Chaetodontidae. It is found in the northwestern Indian Ocean.

Description
The bluecheek butterflyfish has a bright yellow body marked with thin vertical red lines. There a greyish patch behind the eyes, whereas most related species have an eye bar. The dorsal, anal, pelvic and caudal fins are yellow.

Distribution
The bluecheek butterflyfish is found in the northwestern Indian Ocean where it occurs in the Red Sea and the Gulf of Aden, as Far East as the coast of Oman.

Habitat and biology
The bluecheek butterflyfish  is one of the few fish species to have long-term mates. In the wild, the fish eats hard corals as well as benthic invertebrates. This is a common species which is found in areas with rich coral growth. They are frequently recorded in pairs or in small shoals. They have been known to occasionally hover in a stationary position for long periods beneath ledges of plate corals of the genus Acropora. It is oviparous species which forms pairs when spawning. This is normally during the day and the fishes emerge and are active at night.

Systematics
The bluecheek butterflyfish was first formally described in 1831 by the French anatomist Georges Cuvier with the type locality given as the Red Sea at Massawain  Eritrea and Al-Luhayya, Yemen. It belongs to the large subgenus Rabdophorus which might warrant recognition as a distinct genus. In this group, it seems closest to a group containing the blackback butterflyfish (C. melannotus), the spot-naped butterflyfish (C. oxycephalus), or the peculiar black-wedged butterflyfish (C. falcula) and Pacific double-saddle butterflyfish or "false falcula", (C. ulietensis). Though the present species does not share their white body with black on the back and caudal peduncle and even lacks the typical eyestripe of Chaetodon, it has the same tell-tale blue vertical lines as these species.

Footnotes

References
  (2007): Molecular phylogenetics of the butterflyfishes (Chaetodontidae): Taxonomy and biogeography of a global coral reef fish family. Mol. Phylogenet. Evol. 45(1): 50–68.  (HTML abstract)
  (2008): Chaetodon semilarvatus. Version of 2008-JUL-24. Retrieved 2008-SEP-01.
  (2007): Molecular phylogeny of Chaetodon (Teleostei: Chaetodontidae) in the Indo-West Pacific: evolution in geminate species pairs and species groups. Raffles Bulletin of Zoology Supplement 14: 77–86. PDF fulltext

External links
 

Chaetodon
Fish described in 1831
Taxa named by Georges Cuvier